Astonishia Story (어스토니시아 스토리) is a series of 2D role-playing video games created by the Korean video game developer Sonnori. The first game in the series was released as Astonishia Story for MS-DOS in South Korea in 1994. A sequel, also for Windows, was released in July 1994 in South Korea under the title Astonishia Story: Forgotten Saga. In 2002, a remake of the original game, Astonishia Story R was published for the Korean GP32 handheld system. It was subsequently ported to the Windows and PlayStation Portable platforms.

The PlayStation Portable rendition of Astonishia Story R was released in 2005 as Astonishia Story, having been enhanced further and adjusted to fit the PSP's 16:9 screen ratio. The game has since been licensed by Ubisoft and was published in the United States on June 27, 2006 and in Europe on June 30, 2006. This was the first time that a game in the Astonishia Story series has made it to the West.

Gameplay

Plot

100 years ago the Life Tree died and the elves began to die out. Brimhil, the eternally youthful queen of the elves, gave up her youth to revive the Tree. 100 years later, in the present, elves are being mistreated by humans and a half-elf Francis De La Cross attempts to obtain the power of the god-like creature to turn the tables and restore Brimhil's youth before she dies.

A young knight named Sir Lloyd von Roiental is transporting a holy staff known as the Wand of Kinan (카이난의 지팡이). He is ambushed and the staff is stolen by Francis, and Lloyd goes off to recover it. Along the way, he is joined by several other people who join his quest for different reasons.

Characters
Lloyd von Roiental (로이드 폰 로이엔탈 age 24, Knight): Lloyd has been promoted rapidly at an early age and is the vice-commander of the Palmira 5th Infantry. He is very proud of his title and ability, but not very good at controlling his emotions.
Ylenne (일레느 Age 22, Apprentice Wizard): The granddaughter of Lezail, Ylenne is one of the Eight Counselors in Astonishia. Lloyd saves her when abducted by the thief Karof. While at times bold and somewhat immature, she is also kind and very understanding.
Rudoug (러덕 Age 25, Monk): Rudoug is Carrahan's best pupil, a well-mannered warrior with a strong sense of justice and loyalty.
Rendalf (렝달프 Age 180, Merchant/Warrior): Rendalf is a veteran general who has now become a merchant. Unlike his fellow dwarves, he does not get angry easily.
Lezail (레자일 Age 135, Wizard): Lezail has demonstrated extreme intelligence and outstanding magic abilities ever since childhood. He is now one of the eight Nestors of Astonishia.
Akra (아크라 Age Unknown, Magic Monk): A strong disliker of discrimination, Akra seems cold and bitter, but is really warmhearted on the inside.
Jenas (지나스 Age 118, Archer): The last survivor of Halken Village, Jenas is the only person who can speak the archaism of the ancient Elf Empire.
Hataik (핫타이크 Age 12, Fighter): Hataik is the heir of the Asakan blood, and the wielder of the family sword, the Galangan. Young and somewhat stubborn, he believes no one is superior to him. Temporary character.
Francis De La Cross (프랜시스 드 라크로스 Age 126, Knight): Wielder of one of the five legendary swords, the Flame Striker (A.K.A. the Sharkin), Francis later encounters Lezail and helps him solve the case of Ferarin's Life Tree.
Brimhild (브림휠트 Age 280, Queen/Wizard): The only daughter of the king of Ferarin, Brimhild is exhausted from seeing her land endure harassment and discrimination from nearby counties. Over the years of her accumulated age, she has gained vast knowledge.
Herzo (헤르저 Age 232, Knight): Leader of Ferarin's army, along with Akra.
Patton (패튼 Age 40, Fighter): Queen Brimhild hires Patton as chief of her mercenary troops. He is vulgar and mean, having no consideration for others when it comes to having his way. His unorganized strategies always lead to him and Herzo getting into arguments.
Dryden (드라이덴 Age Unknown, Class Unknown): The most mysterious person in Astonishia's history, few people know his identity.

Reception

The PSP version was met with mixed reception upon release, as GameRankings gave it a score of 50.76%, while Metacritic gave it 48 out of 100. The English translation was considered very poor as it is full of grammatical errors.

Legacy
The sequel to Astonisha Story is titled Crimson Gem Saga in English and Garnet Chronicle in Japan.

References

External links
Official website (Ubisoft)
Official website (SCEA)

1994 video games
2002 video games
DOS games
Fantasy video games
Mobile games
PlayStation Portable games
Role-playing video games
Ubisoft games
Video games developed in South Korea
Windows games